Gauteng is one of the nine provinces of South Africa. The name in Sotho-Tswana languages means 'place of gold'.

Situated on the Highveld, Gauteng is the smallest province by land area in South Africa. It also the only province with no international borders. Although Gauteng accounts for only 1.5% of the country's land area, it is home to more than a quarter of its population (26%). Highly urbanised, the province contains the country's largest city, Johannesburg, which is also one of the largest cities in the world. Gauteng is the wealthiest province in South Africa and is considered as the financial hub of not only South Africa but the entire African continent, mostly concentrated in Johannesburg. It also contains the administrative capital, Pretoria, and other large areas such as Midrand, Vanderbijlpark, Ekurhuleni and the affluent Sandton. Gauteng is the most populous province in South Africa with a population of approximately 16.1 million people according to mid year 2022 estimates.

Etymology
The name Gauteng is derived from the Sotho-Tswana name,  meaning "gold". There was a thriving gold industry in the province following the 1886 discovery of gold in Johannesburg. In Setswana, the name  was used for Johannesburg and surrounding areas long before it was adopted in 1994 as the official name of the province.

History

Gauteng was formed from part of the old Transvaal Province after South Africa's first multiracial elections on 27 April 1994. It was initially named Pretoria–Witwatersrand–Vereeniging (PWV) and was renamed "Gauteng" on the 28th of June 1995, together with two other provinces. The term "PWV" describing the region existed long before the establishment of the province, with the "V" sometimes standing for "Vaal Triangle" rather than Vereeniging.

At the Sterkfontein caves, some of the oldest fossils of hominids have been discovered, such as Mrs. Ples and Little Foot.

Gauteng's history has only been properly documented since the 19th century and as a result, not much information regarding its history predating the 19th century is available.  The recorded history of the area that is now Gauteng can be traced back to the early 19th century when settlers originating from the Cape Colony defeated chief Mzilikazi and started establishing villages in the area.

The city of Pretoria was founded in 1855 as capital of the South African Republic (ZAR - ). After the discovery of gold in 1886, the region became the single largest gold producer in the world and the city of Johannesburg was founded. The older city Pretoria was not subject to the same attention and development. Pretoria grew at a slower rate and was highly regarded due to its role in the Second Boer War. The Cullinan Diamond which is the largest diamond ever mined was mined near Pretoria in a nearby town called Cullinan in the year 1905.

Many crucial events happened in present-day Gauteng with regards to the anti-apartheid struggle, such as the Freedom Charter of 1955, Women's March of 1956, Sharpeville massacre of 1960, the Rivonia Trial of 1963 and 1964, the little Rivonia Trial of 1964, the Soweto Uprising of 1976 and Sharpeville Six of 1984. Today, the Apartheid Museum stands testament to these struggles in Johannesburg.

Law and government

Gauteng is governed by the Gauteng Provincial Legislature, a 73-person unicameral legislature elected by party-list proportional representation. The legislature elects one of its members as Premier of Gauteng to lead the executive, and the Premier appoints an Executive Council of up to 10 members of the legislature to serve as heads of the various government departments. The provincial government is responsible for the topics allocated to it in the national constitution, including such fields as basic education, health, housing, social services, agriculture and environmental protection.

The most recent election of the provincial legislature was held on 8 May 2019, and the African National Congress (ANC) won 50.19% of the vote and a 37-seat majority in the legislature. The official opposition is the Democratic Alliance, which won 27.45% of the vote and 20 seats. Other parties represented are the Economic Freedom Fighters with eleven seats and the Freedom Front Plus with three seats. The Inkatha Freedom Party and African Christian Democratic Party hold one seat each. Premier David Makhura of the ANC was re-elected as premier on 22 May 2019, at the first meeting of the legislature after the general election. Makhura resigned from the position on 6 October 2022 and Panyaza Lesufi of the ANC was elected to replace him.

The Gauteng Division of the High Court of South Africa, which has seats in Pretoria and Johannesburg, is a superior court with general jurisdiction over the province. Johannesburg is also home to the Constitutional Court, South Africa's highest court, and to a branch of the Labour Court and Labour Appeal Court.

Geography 

Gauteng's southern border is the Vaal River, which separates it from the Free State. It also borders on North West to the west, Limpopo to the north, and Mpumalanga to the east. Gauteng is the only landlocked province of South Africa without a foreign border. Between Johannesburg and Pretoria, there are low parallel ridges and undulating hills, some part of the Magaliesberg Mountains and the Witwatersrand. The north of the province is more subtropical, due to its lower altitude and is mostly dry savanna habitat.

Witwatersrand area

In the southern half of Gauteng, the Witwatersrand area is an older term describing a 120 km wide oblong-shaped conurbation from Randfontein in the West to Nigel in the East, named after the Witwatersrand, a geologically and economically important series of low ridges and their associated plateau that greater Johannesburg developed on. This area is also often referred to simply as "Witwatersrand", "the Rand" or "the Reef" (archaic, after the gold reefs that precipitated the development of the area), and was the "W" in PWV, the initial name for Gauteng. It has traditionally been divided into the three areas of East Rand (governed by the Ekurhuleni Metropolitan Municipality), Central Rand (approximately today's Johannesburg Municipality) and West Rand.

Climate
The climate is mostly influenced by altitude. Most precipitation occurs as brief afternoon thunderstorms; however, relative humidity never becomes uncomfortable. Winters are crisp and dry with frost occurring often in the southern areas. Snow is rare, but it has occurred on some occasions in the Johannesburg metropolitan area.

Cities and towns

 Alberton
 Atteridgeville
 Benoni
 Boksburg
 Bronkhorstspruit 
 Brakpan 
 Carletonville
 Centurion
 Cullinan 
 Edenvale
 Ga-Rankuwa
 Germiston
 Hammanskraal 
 Heidelberg
 Johannesburg
 Kempton Park
 Krugersdorp
 Mabopane
 Mamelodi
 Magaliesburg
 Meyerton
 Midrand
 Nigel
 Parkhurst
 Pretoria
 Randburg
 Randfontein 
 Roodepoort 
 Rosebank
 Sandton
 Soshanguve
 Soweto
 Springs
 Tembisa
 Vanderbijlpark
 Vereeniging
 Winterveldt

Administrative divisions

The Gauteng Province (as of May 2011) is divided into three metropolitan municipalities and two district municipalities. The district municipalities are in turn divided into six local municipalities:

District municipalities
 Sedibeng District
 Emfuleni
 Lesedi
 Midvaal
 West Rand District
 Merafong City
 Mogale City
 Rand West City

Metropolitan municipalities
 Tshwane Metropolitan Municipality (Pretoria)
 Johannesburg Metropolitan Municipality
 Ekurhuleni Metropolitan Municipality

The former Metsweding district consisting of Nokeng Tsa Taemane and Kungwini in the North of the province was incorporated into Tshwane in 2011.

Demographics 

Gauteng Province is home to 16.1 million  people (2022 Stats SA Mid-year estimates), with 26% of the total South African population. Gauteng Province is also the fastest growing province, experiencing a population growth of over 33% between the 1996 and 2011 censuses, thus Gauteng now has the largest population of any province in South Africa, though the smallest land area.

As of the census of 2011, there are 12,272,263 people and 3,909,022 households residing in Gauteng. The population density is 680/km². The density of households is 155.86/km². But in 2021, it is estimated to have 15,810,388 people and 5.1 million households residing in Gauteng.

About 22.1% of all households are made up of individuals. The average household size is 3.33.

The province's age distribution was 23.6% under the age of 15, 19.6% from 15 to 24, 37.9% from 25 to 44, 15.0% from 45 to 64, and 4.0% who are 65 years of age or older. The median age is 27 years. For every 100 females there are 101.2 males. For every 100 females age 18 and over, there are 102.3 males.

According to the 2011 census, in Gauteng, the most spoken languages at home were:
 Zulu: 19.8% of residents,
 English: 13.3%,
 Afrikaans: 12.4%,
 Sesotho: 11.6%,
 Sepedi: 10.6%,
 Setswana: 9.1%,
 IsiXhosa: 6.6%,
 Xitsonga: 6.6%,
 IsiNdebele: 3.2%,
 Tshivenda: 2.3%,
 SiSwati: 1.1%,
 South African Sign Language: 0.4%,
 Other languages: 3.1%.

76.0% of residents are Christian, 18.4% have no religion, 1.7% are Muslim, 0.5% are Jewish, and 0.8% are Hindu. 2.6% have other or undetermined beliefs.

8.4% of residents aged 20 and over have received no schooling, 11.2% have had some primary, 5.5% have completed only primary school, 34.3% have had some high education, 28.0% have finished only high school, and 12.6% have an education higher than the high school level. Overall, 40.6% of residents have completed high school.

56.1% of housing units have a telephone and/or mobile phone in the dwelling, 41.5% have access to a phone nearby, and 2.3% have access that is not nearby or no access. 82.8% of households have a flush or chemical toilet. 84.2% have refuse removed by the municipality at least once a week and 2.6% have no rubbish disposal. 47.2% have running water inside their dwelling, 83.6% have running water on their property, and 97.5% have access to running water. 73.2% of households use electricity for cooking, 70.4% for heating, and 80.8% for lighting. 77.4% of households have a radio, 65.7% have a television, 15.1% own a computer, 62.1% have a refrigerator, and 45.1% have a mobile phone.

25.8% of the population aged 15–65 is unemployed.

The median annual income of working adults aged 15–65 is R 23 539 ($3,483). Males have a median annual income of R 24 977 ($3,696) versus R 20 838 ($3,083) for females.

</div>

Life expectancy
Gauteng is the province with the second highest life expectancy in the country in 2019 with females having a life expectancy of 69 years and males having a life expectancy of 64 years. At birth, life expectancy for 2013 is approximated at 57 years and 61 years for males and females respectively. This marks an improvement of a whole year in the life expectancy of South Africans as a whole.

Urban conurbation, The Gauteng City Region (GCR)
Thomas Brinkhoff lists a "Consolidated Urban Area" in Gauteng as having a population of 13.1 million . The future governmental plans for the region indicate the gradual urbanisation and consolidation towards the creation of a megalopolis that connects these metros.

The Gauteng City Region Observatory (GCRO) 
The GCRO is a collaboration between the Universities of Johannesburg and Witwatersrand, the city of Johannesburg, Gauteng Provincial Government, and SALGA-Gauteng. The GCRO's purpose is to collect information and create a database on the Gauteng City Region to provide to Government, Lawmakers and civil society an informed understanding of the fastest urbanizing region in Southern Africa.

Economy 

Gauteng is considered the economic hub of South Africa and contributes heavily in the financial, manufacturing, transport, technology, and telecommunications sectors, among others. It also plays host to a large number of overseas companies requiring a commercial base in and gateway to Africa.

Gauteng is home to the Johannesburg Stock Exchange, the largest stock exchange in Africa. Some of the largest companies in Africa and abroad are based in Gauteng, or have offices and branches there, such as Vodacom, MTN, Neotel, Microsoft South Africa and the largest Porsche Centre in the world.

Although Gauteng is the smallest of South Africa's nine provinces—it covers a mere 1.5% of the country's total land area, the province is responsible for a third of South Africa's gross domestic product (GDP). Gauteng generates about 10% of the total GDP of sub-Saharan Africa and about 7% of total African GDP.

Transport

SANRAL, a parastatal, is responsible for the maintenance, development and management of all national road networks in South Africa. SANRAL is responsible for instituting the Gauteng Freeway Improvement Project, which was met with a lot of opposition due to the tolling of Gauteng motorists. Many important national routes run through Gauteng such as the N1, N3, N4, N12, N14 and the N17. Johannesburg is quite dependent on freeways for transport in and around the city. The R21, R24, R59, M1 and M2 all run through Johannesburg while the R80 connects Pretoria Central to Soshanguve.
The Gauteng Freeway Improvement Project led to a large decrease in traffic congestion when construction finished 2011–2012. Cape Town, for the first time in decades, is now the most congested city in South Africa.

PUTCO, the largest commuter bus operator in South Africa, services the Gauteng area extensively. The bus rapid transit system Rea Vaya also serves to transport people from Johannesburg's southern neighbourhoods into and around the CBD. In an interview, Parks Tau stated that by 2040, Johannesburg will be dominated by pedestrians and public transport as opposed to the use of private transport or informal transport, such as minibus taxis.

Gautrain and Metrorail both service the province's public transport sector where trains are concerned and Gautrain offers a bus service that transports commuters to and from various train stations and predetermined bus stops. Metrorail trains are considered one of the most cost-effective methods of transportation in and around Gauteng.

The OR Tambo International Airport, Rand Airport, Lanseria International Airport, Wonderboom Airport and Grand Central Airport are located in Gauteng.

There is a large informal transport sector in Gauteng, consisting of thousands of minibus taxis, which many of the urban and rural population makes use of. However, it is noted that taxis are often unsafe as their drivers ignore the rules of the road and the vehicles are often not roadworthy. The City of Johannesburg stated that: "major initiatives are under way to completely reform the taxi industry and provide more comfort and safety to customers." In March 2017, it is reported that Gauteng alone has 4,7 million registered vehicles under the "GP" abbreviation via the eNatis system.

Education 

Gauteng is a large center of learning in South Africa, and it has many universities and educational institutions of higher learning.

Universities
Monash
University South Africa Campus
 Tshwane University of Technology
 University of Johannesburg
 Sefako Makgatho Health Sciences University
 University of Pretoria
 University of South Africa
 University of the Witwatersrand
 Vaal University of Technology

Colleges

In 2002, the Gauteng Department of Education founded an initiative called Gauteng Online in an attempt to get the entire province to utilize a wide assortment of electronic and telecommunications systems. In 2007, this initiative was handed over to the Gauteng Department of Finance.

In the 2013 national budget speech, it was announced that the Gauteng Department of Education would be granted over R700 million to improve education and to alleviate issues concerning the overcrowding in schools, a shortage in teaching staff and transport for poor pupils.

In 2017/2018, the Gauteng Provincial government spent R42.4 billion on education which accounted for 38% the province's total expenditure.

Conservation 
Although Gauteng province is dominated by the urban areas of Johannesburg and Pretoria, it has several nature reserves. Gauteng is home to the Cradle of Humankind UNESCO World Heritage Site which includes the Sterkfontein caves and the Wonder Cave Kromdraai. Johannesburg is home to the largest man-made urban forest in the world.

Botanical gardens 
 Walter Sisulu National Botanical Garden
 Johannesburg Botanical Garden
 Pretoria National Botanical Garden

Nature reserves 
 Rietvlei Nature Reserve
 Suikerbosrand Nature Reserve
 Groenkloof Nature Reserve
 Dinokeng Game Reserve

Private and municipal reserves 
 Kromdraai Conservancy
 Krugersdorp Nature Reserve
 Rietvlei Nature Reserve
 Wonderboom Nature Reserve

Provincial reserves

There are 5 provincial reserves managed by the Gauteng Department of Agriculture, Conservation, Environment and Land Affairs:
 Abe Bailey Nature Reserve
 Alice Glockner Nature Reserve
 Marievale Bird Sanctuary
 Roodeplaat Nature Reserve
 Suikerbosrand Nature Reserve

Sport 

Gauteng is home to many stadiums and sporting grounds, notably Soccer City, Ellis Park Stadium, Odi Stadium, Loftus Versfeld Stadium, Lucas Moripe Stadium, Giant Stadium, Orlando Stadium, Johannesburg Stadium, the Wanderers Stadium and SuperSport Park.

Several teams from Gauteng play in the country's top-level association football (more commonly referred to as soccer) league, the Premier Soccer League (PSL), including Mamelodi Sundowns, SuperSport United, Kaizer Chiefs and Orlando Pirates. The national squad Bafana Bafana's home stadium is Soccer City in Johannesburg. During the 2010 FIFA World Cup, the first ever world cup held by an African nation, Gauteng's stadia hosted many games. The first ever FIFA world cup match on African soil took place at Soccer City on 11 June 2010. Along with Soccer City, Loftus Versfeld Stadium and Ellis Park Stadium hosted matches in Gauteng.

Rugby, or more accurately rugby union, is a popular sport in South Africa, and in Gauteng in particular. Two rugby teams from Gauteng participate in the Southern Hemisphere Super Rugby championship: the Pretoria-based Bulls, and the Johannesburg-based Lions (previously the Cats). Three Gauteng-based teams play in the country's domestic competition, the Currie Cup: the Blue Bulls from Pretoria, the Golden Lions from Johannesburg and the Falcons from the East Rand. In 1995, South Africa hosted the 1995 Rugby World Cup and proceeded to win the tournament at Ellis Park Stadium on 24 June 1995. The events surrounding the world cup formed the basis of the story for the movie Invictus.

Many South African universities take part in the Varsity Rugby league. Of these, the Gauteng universities include the University of Pretoria, the University of Johannesburg and the University of the Witwatersrand.

Cricket is also widely popular among all cultural groups in the country, and is the only sport to feature in the top two among all of South Africa's major ethnic/racial groups. The Highveld Lions represent both Gauteng and North West in the country's three domestic competitions—the first-class SuperSport Series, the List A one-day MTN Domestic Championship and the Twenty20 Standard Bank Pro 20 Series.

Many marathons take place in Gauteng, such as the Gauteng Marathon, the Arwyp Medical Centre 15 km Nite Race and the Trisport Joburg City Triathlon.

Gauteng's favourable weather conditions throughout the year make it an ideal hub for sports and other out door activities. This makes golf, horse racing and swimming very popular. The Vaal River facilitates water sports in the forms of jet skiing, water skiing and motor boating. Adventure sports are also quite popular in Gauteng, particularly skydiving, paragliding and hang-gliding.

The amusement park Gold Reef City is situated in Gauteng, as is the Johannesburg Zoo and the Pretoria Zoo. Botanical gardens in the province include the Pretoria and Walter Sisulu national botanical gardens maintained by the South African National Botanical Institute as well as the Johannesburg and Manie van der Schijff botanical gardens.

The Ticketpro Dome and the Gallagher Convention Centre, which are both popular events and expos venues, are also located within Gauteng. The province also has a Formula One racetrack, the Kyalami Circuit. The most recent F1 race at the venue was in 1993.

See also

List of speakers of the Gauteng Provincial Legislature

References

External links

Gauteng Provincial Government
Gauteng Tourism Authority
Mashatile elected to lead Gauteng

 
Provinces of South Africa
States and territories established in 1994
1994 establishments in South Africa